EZS may refer to:

 EasyJet Switzerland, an airline
 Elazığ Airport, in Turkey
 Ezzahra Sports, a Tunisian basketball club
 Shawano Municipal Airport, in Wisconsin, United States